Sami Kohen (1928 – 18 October 2021) was a Turkish journalist and columnist. He wrote regular columns about foreign policy for Milliyet since 1954.

Kohen was born in 1928 in Istanbul. He came from a Jewish family. His father was Albert Kohen, who published the La Boz de Türkiye newspaper in Judaeo-Spanish and French, which, after his father's death, was published in Turkish by Sami Kohen as Türkiye'nin sesi. Later, he worked at Tan, Yeni Istanbul and Istanbul Express newspapers. In 1954 he joined Milliyet. Six years later in 1960, he married Mirka. He had two children named Jale and Alp.

Besides Milliyet, Kohen also wrote for Christian Science Monitor and The New York Times.

On 12 October 2020, he was given the High Service Award.

On 18 October 2021, Kohen was admitted to intensive care due to kidney failure. He died later that day.

References 

1928 births
2021 deaths
Journalists from Istanbul
Turkish columnists
Turkish Jews
Milliyet people
Date of birth missing